This House may refer to:

 "This House" (Alison Moyet song), a 1991 song by Alison Moyet
 "This House" (Diana Ross song), from the 1989 album Greatest Hits Live
 "This House" (Tracie Spencer song), a 1990 song by Tracie Spencer
 This House, a 1971 album by Mark Spoelstra
 This House (play), a 2012 play by James Graham
 The House of Commons of the United Kingdom, as referred to by Members of Parliament
 "This House", a 2009 song by Sara Groves from the album Fireflies and Songs